= Beroa =

Beroa may refer to:

- an old spelling of Veria in Greece
- a historical name for Aleppo, Syria
